Titanacris albipes is a species of grasshopper in the family Romaleidae.

References

External links 
 

Romaleidae